Préfète Duffaut (1 January 1923 – 6 October 2012) was a Haitian painter.

Biography 
Born in Cyvadier, Sud-Est, near the seaport of Jacmel, where he lived and worked. The painter Pauleus Vital (1918–1984) was Duffaut's half-brother, the painter Jean Charles Duffaut (*1970) is his son. Duffaut's mother died when he was two years old.

Duffaut was one of the painters, alongside important Haitian artists such as Gesner Abelard and Rigaud Benoit, at the Centre d'Art in the Haitian capital. In the early 1950s Duffaut was one of several artists invited to paint murals in the interior of the Cathedral of Sainte Trinité (largely destroyed in the January 2010 earthquake) in Port-au-Prince; his works there were titled "The Temptation of Christ" and "The Processional Road" (also referred to as the "Procession of the Crossing Guard").

Duffaut paints in the vernacular style and his oeuvre typically consists of fantastical "imaginary cities" (villes imaginaires), that often contain coastal elements with boats. The cityscapes are strongly influenced by the coastal city of Jacmel. Another recurrent theme, especially in earlier works, is imagery associated with Vodou.

Duffaut's work has been exhibited and collected widely outside of Haiti. His body of paintings continues to be a strong influence on contemporary Haitian artists such as Prince Luc (Luckner Candio).

References

Further reading

 
  - Exhibition catalogue of Haitian Art show at The Brooklyn Museum of Art, 09/02 to 11/05, 1978

External links
 Le peintre Préfète Duffaut et la genèse de son oeuvre - Article about the oevre of Duffaut on Caraïb Express Blog by Marie Flore Domond. (French text)
 Préfète Duffaut: piété et urbanisme imaginaire - Excerpt of a 2007 documentary directed by Arnold Antonin. (French and Haitian Creole language)
 Michel Monnin on Préfète Duffaut (French text)
 A History of Haitian Art -  Posted on discoverhaiti.com.
Documentary by Arnold Antonin - Préfète Duffaut: Piété et urbanisme imaginaire

1923 births
2012 deaths
Contemporary painters
Haitian painters
Haitian male painters
People from Jacmel